Saint Twrog - feast day 26 June - was a 6th-century Welsh saint who founded the church at Maentwrog, having come to Wales early in the Age of the Saints.

Early life 
It is believed that Twrog was the son of Ithel Hael o Lydaw of Brittany. He was also the brother of Saint Tanwg of Llandanwg, Saint Tecwyn of Llandecwyn, Saint Tegai of Llandegai and Saint Baglan of Llanfaglan and Baglan.

He was a member of the college of Bardsey which was founded as a monastery in 516 AD.

Dedications 
There are three other dedications to Saint Twrog: Bodwrog in Anglesey (St Twrog's Church, Bodwrog), Llandwrog near Caernarfon, and the ruin on Chapel Rock near Beachley by the Severn Road Bridge.

Maen Twrog 
When Twrog first arrived in the village now called Maentwrog, the valley was very marshy, which provided him with the wattle that he would have needed to build his cell. Outside the church near to the belfry door is a large stone known as the Maen Twrog (maen being the Welsh for stone). Twrog is reputed to have thrown the stone from the top of Moelwyn crushing a pagan altar in the valley below. It is said that his handprints can still be seen in the stone. The parish of Maentwrog gets its name from this stone

In the book of Welsh mythology, the Mabinogion, a hero Pryderi was killed at the Glaslyn river and is buried in Maentwrog.  The boulder supposedly hurled by the saint is the one said to mark Pryderi's grave.

References

Companions of Cadfan
Medieval Welsh saints
6th-century Christian saints